Michael Vela Gonzalez (born May 23, 1978) is an American former professional baseball pitcher. He played in Major League Baseball (MLB) for the Pittsburgh Pirates, Atlanta Braves, Baltimore Orioles, Texas Rangers, Washington Nationals, and Milwaukee Brewers.

Professional career

Pittsburgh Pirates
Gonzalez was traded twice prior to his MLB debut. First, on July 22, 2003, where he was traded by the Pittsburgh Pirates with Scott Sauerbeck to the Boston Red Sox for Brandon Lyon and Anastacio Martinez. Second, on July 31, 2003, where he was traded back to Pittsburgh with Freddy Sanchez and cash for Brandon Lyon, Anastacio Martinez and Jeff Suppan.
Gonzalez converted all 24 save attempts during the 2006 season with the Pittsburgh Pirates before having his season end early because of an elbow injury.

Gonzalez was traded to the Atlanta Braves with Brent Lillibridge for Adam LaRoche and Jamie Romak on January 17, .

Atlanta Braves
After several MRIs showed no damage to his elbow, a more specialized MRI was performed that indeed revealed a slight ligament tear. On May 25, 2007, it was announced that his elbow would require Tommy John surgery and, consequently, he would miss at least the rest of the 2007 season, and possibly the first half of the  season. In 17 innings with the Braves in 2007, Gonzalez posted a 1.59 ERA with a 2–0 record and 2 saves.

Gonzalez made his return on June 18, 2008, pitching a perfect 9th inning and recording a save against the Texas Rangers.

On January 19, 2009, Gonzalez avoided arbitration and signed a one-year $3.45 million contract.

Baltimore Orioles
On December 16, 2009, Gonzalez agreed to a deal with the Baltimore Orioles for two years and $12 million.

On December 19, 2009, Gonzalez officially signed with the Baltimore Orioles.

On April 14, 2010, Gonzalez was placed on the 15-day DL with a strained left shoulder.

Texas Rangers
On August 31, 2011, Gonzalez was traded to the Texas Rangers in exchange for Pedro Strop. In 2011, he was a combined 2–2 with a 4.39 ERA and 1 save. Gonzalez made his postseason debut with the Rangers in 2011 until the team lost the 2011 World Series to the St. Louis Cardinals.

Washington Nationals
On May 10, 2012, the Washington Nationals agreed to terms with Gonzalez on a 1-year, minor league deal. The Nationals called Gonzalez up to the majors on June 3.

Milwaukee Brewers
On December 29, 2012, Gonzalez agreed to a one-year $2.21 million  deal, pending a physical.

Second stint with Washington
Gonzalez returned to the Washington Nationals in 2014, agreeing to a minor league contract on March 4. He was released on July 5, 2014.

Toros de Tijuana
On April 8, 2016, Gonzalez signed with the Toros de Tijuana of the Mexican Baseball League.

References

External links
, or Retrosheet, or Pura Pelota (Venezuelan Winter League)

1978 births
Living people
Aberdeen IronBirds players
Altoona Curve players
American baseball players of Mexican descent
American expatriate baseball players in Mexico
Atlanta Braves players
Augusta GreenJackets players
Baltimore Orioles players
Baseball players from Texas
Bowie Baysox players
Gulf Coast Orioles players
Gulf Coast Pirates players
Indianapolis Indians players
Lynchburg Hillcats players
Major League Baseball pitchers
Mexican League baseball pitchers
Milwaukee Brewers players
Mississippi Braves players
Nashville Sounds players
Norfolk Tides players
Pawtucket Red Sox players
Pittsburgh Pirates players
Richmond Braves players
San Jacinto Central Ravens baseball players
San Jacinto College alumni
Sportspeople from Corpus Christi, Texas
Syracuse Chiefs players
Texas Rangers players
Tiburones de La Guaira players
American expatriate baseball players in Venezuela
Toros de Tijuana players
Washington Nationals players